Dustin Douglas Molleken (born August 21, 1984) is a Canadian former professional baseball pitcher. He played in Nippon Professional Baseball (NPB) for the Hokkaido Nippon-Ham Fighters, and in Major League Baseball (MLB) for the Detroit Tigers. Molleken has also competed for the Canadian national baseball team.

Career
Molleken attended Cochrane High School in Regina, Saskatchewan, and Lethbridge Community College in Lethbridge, Alberta.

Pittsburgh Pirates
He was drafted by the Pittsburgh Pirates in the 15th round (435th overall) of the 2003 MLB draft. He made his professional debut with the GCL Pirates. After not playing in a game in 2004, Molleken spent 2005 again with the GCL Pirates, allowing 24 runs in 30.0 innings of work. In 2006, Molleken spent the season in Low-A ball with the Williamsport Crosscutters, pitching to a 2.51 ERA with 22 strikeouts in 13 games. He split the 2007 season between three affiliates, the Low-A State College Spikes, the Single-A Hickory Crawdads, and the High-A Lynchburg Hillcats, accumulating a 3.92 ERA with 44 strikeouts in 39.0 innings for the three teams. He split 2008 between Lynchburg and Hickory, registering a 8-6 record and 6.40 ERA in 32 appearances. In 2009, he played for Lynchburg and the Double-A Altoona Curve, recording a 4.02 ERA in 36 games for the teams. He remained in Double-A with Altoona for the 2010 season, pitching to a 4-4 record and 4.15 ERA in 31 games. On November 6, 2010, Molleken elected free agency.

Colorado Rockies
Following the 2010 season, Molleken signed a minor league contract with the Colorado Rockies. He split the 2010 season between the Triple-A Colorado Springs Sky Sox and the Double-A Tulsa Drillers, pitching to a cumulative 5.05 ERA in 36 appearances. On November 14, 2011, Molleken re-signed with the Rockies on a minor league contract that included an invitation to Spring Training. He spent the year in Colorado Springs, and pitched to a 3-0 record and 5.18 ERA before being released to pursue an opportunity in Japan.

Hokkaido Nippon-Ham Fighters
On July 19, 2012, Molleken signed with the Hokkaido Nippon-Ham Fighters of Nippon Professional Baseball. Molleken appeared in 23 games for the Fighters in 2012, registering a 3.27 ERA in 22.0 innings. He played in the Japan Series for the Fighters that year as well. In 5 appearances for the Fighters in 2013, Molleken pitched to a 3.68 ERA with 5 strikeouts.

Milwaukee Brewers
On July 22, 2013, Molleken signed a minor league contract with the Milwaukee Brewers organization was assigned to the Triple-A Nashville Sounds. Molleken was invited to Spring Training with the Brewers for the 2014 season but did not make the team and was assigned to Nashville to begin the season. He pitched to a 4.84 ERA with 89 strikeouts in 74.1 innings for the Sounds in 2014 and elected free agency after the year.

Cleveland Indians
On November 18, 2014, Molleken signed a minor league contract with the Cleveland Indians organization. He spent the season with the Triple-A Columbus Clippers, pitching to a 5-3 record and 3.25 ERA in 40 appearances. On November 6, 2015, he elected free agency.

Detroit Tigers
On December 23, 2015, Molleken signed a minor league contract with the Detroit Tigers. After starting the season in Triple-A, on June 20, 2016, Molleken had his contract purchased and was added to the 25-man roster when journeyman Casey McGehee was designated for assignment. He was optioned back to Triple-A three days later without having appeared in a game. He was recalled, and made his MLB debut on July 4. Molleken pitched to a 4.32 ERA in 4 appearances for the Tigers in 2016. On November 9, Molleken elected free agency after being outrighted off the 40-man roster.

He signed a new minor league contract on November 18, 2016. Molleken was assigned to the Triple-A Toledo Mud Hens to begin the 2017 season. On June 28, 2017, Molleken was released by the Tigers organization.

Somerset Patriots
On July 3, 2017, Molleken signed with the Somerset Patriots of the Atlantic League of Professional Baseball. In 2017, Molleken pitched to a 3-2 record and 4.18 ERA in 26 games. He became a free agent after the 2017 season. On February 23, 2018, Molleken re-signed with the Somerset Patriots. In 2018 for Somerset, Molleken recorded a 3.90 ERA in 43 appearances.

Québec Capitales
On November 1, 2018, Molleken signed with the Québec Capitales of the Can-Am League for the 2019 season. In 2019, Molleken registered a 2.51 ERA with 7 saves in 28 games. He was released on February 18, 2020.

Tecolotes de los Dos Laredos
On February 19, 2020, Molleken signed with the Tecolotes de los Dos Laredos of the Mexican League. Molleken did not play in a game in 2020 due to the cancellation of the Mexican League season because of the COVID-19 pandemic.

International career
Molleken has played for the Canada national baseball team.

In 2011, he participated in the 2011 Baseball World Cup, winning the bronze medal, and the Pan American Games, winning the gold medal.

On January 9, 2019, he was selected for the 2019 Pan American Games Qualifier, and later participated in the 2019 Pan American Games.

On October 8, 2019, he was selected for the 2019 WBSC Premier12.

Coaching career
On August 29, 2020, Molleken joined the Prairie Baseball Academy's coaching staff as the new pitching coach.

Personal life
Molleken is the nephew of longtime Western Hockey League coach Lorne Molleken.

References

External links

1984 births
Living people
Altoona Curve players
Baseball people from Saskatchewan
Baseball players at the 2011 Pan American Games
Baseball players at the 2019 Pan American Games
Canadian expatriate baseball players in Japan
Canadian expatriate baseball players in the United States
Colorado Springs Sky Sox players
Columbus Clippers players
Detroit Tigers players
Gulf Coast Pirates players
Hickory Crawdads players
Hokkaido Nippon-Ham Fighters players
Lynchburg Hillcats players
Major League Baseball pitchers
Major League Baseball players from Canada
Nashville Sounds players
Nippon Professional Baseball pitchers
Pan American Games gold medalists for Canada
Pan American Games medalists in baseball
Pan American Games silver medalists for Canada
Québec Capitales players
Somerset Patriots players
Sportspeople from Regina, Saskatchewan
State College Spikes players
Toledo Mud Hens players
Tulsa Drillers players
Williamsport Crosscutters players
World Baseball Classic players of Canada
2013 World Baseball Classic players
2015 WBSC Premier12 players
2017 World Baseball Classic players
2019 WBSC Premier12 players
Medalists at the 2019 Pan American Games
Medalists at the 2011 Pan American Games
Canadian expatriate baseball players in the Dominican Republic
Estrellas Orientales players
Tigres del Licey players